The Ninth World Trade Organization Ministerial Conference was held in Bali, Indonesia from 3 to 7 December 2013. The conference was chaired by the Indonesian Trade Minister Gita Wirjawan.

In this conference, 159 members of World Trade Organization agreed to the Bali Package which aims to ease barriers to international trade.

Yemen's agreement was also registered, dependent on the country's membership ratification.

References

External links 
 Ninth WTO Ministerial Conference

World Trade Organization ministerial conferences
December 2013 events in Asia
2013 in Indonesia